Foton-M No.4 is a Russian microgravity and bioscience research spacecraft launched in July 2014 as part of the Foton programme. It is the fourth spacecraft in the Foton-M series, and the first to use the 34KSM configuration incorporating the equipment module from a Yantar satellite in place of that of a Zenit on earlier missions.

Foton-M No.4 was launched from the Baikonur Cosmodrome on 18 July 2014, atop a Soyuz-2-1a carrier rocket. The launch was completed successfully, with the satellite separating from its rocket and beginning data transmission to its controllers. However, after four orbits, it ceased responding to commands issued to it from the ground. As a consequence of this, the spacecraft did not perform an orbit-raising maneuver that had been scheduled to occur shortly after orbital insertion. Satellite control was regained on 26 July by which time some of the microgravity experiments had already begun. On 1 August the head of Roskosmos, Oleg Ostapenko, was quoted as saying that the satellite will fly its entire two-month mission as originally planned, despite the cancellation of the orbit-boosting maneuver. However, all of the experiments completed by 27 August, and the Russian space agency decided to return the spacecraft to Earth on 1 September, two weeks earlier than the original 15 September target landing date.

Aboard the spacecraft are specimens for research on the biological effects of zero gravity and cosmic radiation. The specimens include geckos, silkworm eggs, dried seeds, fruit flies, and mushrooms. The geckos are part of biology experiments by Russia's Institute of Medico-Biological Problems on the effects of weightlessness on mating. Initial reports after the payload's return indicate that all five of the geckos launched in the experiment had died. Investigation is underway to determine the cause of death. However, the fruit flies did survive the trip and were able to breed and develop successfully.

Another experiment aboard the spacecraft is designed to measure the effects of microgravity on semiconductor crystal growth, with the ultimate goal of producing higher-quality crystals for use in electronics.

References

Spacecraft launched in 2014
Spacecraft which reentered in 2014
Spacecraft launched by Soyuz-2 rockets
Biosatellites